Adílson is a Portuguese-language given name.

Notable people with the name include:
Adilson da Silva (born 1972), Brazilian professional golfer in South Africa
Adílson dos Santos (born 1976), Brazilian footballer
Adilson E. Motter (born 1974), Brazilian-born American-based scientist working at Northwestern University
Adílson Ferreira de Souza (born 1978), Brazilian footballer
Adilson Nascimento (1951-2009), Brazilian basketball player
Adílson Rodrigues "Maguila" (born 1958), former Brazilian heavyweight boxer
Adilson Soares Cassamá (born 1983), Guinea-Bissauan football (soccer) midfielder
Adilson Tavares Varela (born 1988), Cape Verdean-Swiss footballer
Adilson Tibes Granemann (born 1982), Brazilian footballer
Adílson Warken, Brazilian footballer
Adílson Cândido de Souza, Brazilian football goalkeeper
Adílson Dias Batista, Brazilian footballer
Adílson Luíz Anastácio, Brazilian footballer
Adilson (Portuguese footballer), Portuguese footballer

Additionally in the Portuguese language Wikipedia:
:pt:Adílson Alves da Silva "Mestre Adílson" (1952), Brazilian capoeirista
:pt:Adílson Ramos (1945), Brazilian singer
:pt:Adílson Heleno, Brazilian footballer
:pt:Adilson Marques, Brazilian spiritualist
:pt:Adílson Soares, Brazilian politician
:pt:Adilson Marcelino Alves, Brazilian criminal
:pt:Adilsom Antônio Martins, Brazilian spiritualist

References

Portuguese masculine given names